Holt High School may refer to:

 Holt High School (Michigan), Holt, Michigan
 Wentzville Holt High School, Wentzville, Missouri
 Childwall Sports and Science Academy formerly known as Holt High School, in Liverpool, England
 Holt High School, part of Tuscaloosa County Schools in Alabama